KNNA-LP (95.7 FM, "KNNA 95.7FM: The Cross") is a radio station licensed to serve the community of Lincoln, Nebraska. The station is owned by Good Shepherd Community Radio. It airs a Lutheran format.

The station was assigned the KNNA-LP call letters by the Federal Communications Commission on March 14, 2014.

References

External links
 Official Website
 FCC Public Inspection File for KNNA-LP
 

NNA-LP
Radio stations established in 2016
2016 establishments in Nebraska
NNA-LP
Lancaster County, Nebraska